Šentpavel pri Domžalah ( or) is a small settlement south of Domžale in the Upper Carniola region of Slovenia.

Name
The name of the settlement was changed from Šent Pavel to Šentpavel pri Domžalah in 1955.  In the past the German name was Sankt Paul.

References

External links

Šentpavel pri Domžalah on Geopedia

Populated places in the Municipality of Domžale